The Paladin Golden Eagle is an American powered parachute, that was designed and produced by Paladin Industries of Pennsauken, New Jersey.

The company's website was removed in 2012, the company seems to have gone out of business and production ended.

Design and development
The Golden Eagle was designed as a US FAR 103 Ultralight Vehicles two-seat trainer. It features a parachute-style high-wing, two-seats-in-tandem accommodation, tricycle landing gear and a single  Hirth 2706 engine in pusher configuration. The  Rotax 582 engine is a factory option.

The aircraft carriage is constructed from a combination of bolted aluminium and 4130 steel tubing. In flight steering is accomplished via a weight-shift tilt-bar that actuates the canopy brakes, creating roll and yaw. On the ground the aircraft has lever-controlled nosewheel steering. The landing gear incorporates independent hydraulic struts for suspension. The aircraft was factory supplied in the form of an assembly kit that required 50 hours to complete.

Specifications (Golden Eagle)

References

External links

1990s United States ultralight aircraft
Single-engined pusher aircraft
Powered parachutes